The Archdeacon of Norwich is a senior ecclesiastical officer in the Church of England Diocese of Norwich, who exercises supervision of clergy and responsibility for church buildings within the geographical area of her or his archdeaconry.

History
The ancient Archdeaconry of Norwich has been an ecclesiastical jurisdiction within the Diocese of Norwich since its creation around 1100 – at which time the first archdeacons were being appointed across the nation.

List of archdeacons

High Medieval
Diocesan archdeacons:
Four archdeacons occur in records but cannot be clearly identified with a particular territory:
bef. 1086–aft. 1107: Geoffrey
bef. 1107–aft. 1114: Alfred
bef. 1101–aft. 1115: Osbern
bef. 1111–aft. 1115: Walter
Archdeacons of Norwich:
bef. 1127–aft. 1148: William (I)
aft. 1146: Ralph
bef. 1161–aft. 1164: Philip
bef. 1168–aft. 1178: William (II)
bef. 1182–aft. 1198: Thomas
1200–1225 (res.): Geoffrey de Burgh
1228–1229 (res.): Luke the chaplain (became Archbishop of Dublin)
1229–aft. 1238: John of Ferentino
bef. 1248–aft. 1252: William de Suffield
 & : post not vacant
bef. 1273–aft. 1289 (res.): Thomas de Skerning (became Archdeacon of Suffolk)

Late Medieval
4 February 1302 – 1324 (res.): William de Knapton (became Archdeacon of Suffolk)
16 April 1324–bef. 1328 (res.): Roger de Snetisham
8 December 1328 – 1340 (res.): William Bateman
1340–1347 (res.): Thomas Fastolf
January 1347–bef. 1349: Hamo de Belers
February 1347–bef. May 1347 (rev.): Thomas de Bradwardine (ineffective royal grant)
May 1347–?: John Berenger (ineffective royal grant)
27 August 1349 – 1355 (d.): Richard Lyng
9 April 1355–bef. 1361 (d.): Richard de Norwico
17 October 1361 – 27 March 1387 (exch.): William Swynflet
27 March 1387–aft. 1801: John Derlyngton
17 November 1395: John de Middleton (ineffective royal grant)
November 1406–bef. November 1407 (res.): Robert Wolveden
12 November 1407–bef. 1419 (d.): William Westacre
11 April 1419 – 1426 (d.): Henry Kays
bef. 1428–aft. 1455: Richard Cawdray
bef. 1465–1459 (res.): John Hales
bef. 1461–bef. 1462 (res.): John Morton
bef. 1463–aft. 1463: Vincent Clement
bef. 1472–3 January 1477 (exch.): John Morton (again; also Archdeacon of Winchester from 1475 and of Berks from 1476)
3 January 1477–aft. 1483: Thomas Marke
bef. 1484–1497 (res.): Nicholas Goldwell (became Archdeacon of Suffolk)
20 April 1497–bef. 1509 (res.): Robert Honywood
14 June 1509–bef. 1517 (d.): John Ednam
5 February 1517 – 1522 (res.): William Stillington (became Archdeacon of Norfolk)

9 April 1522–bef. 1528 (res.): Thomas Larke
26 June 1528–July 1543 (d.): George Wyndham
25 November 1543–bef. 1557 (d.): Thomas Cornwalleys

Early modern
16 October 1557–bef. 1571 (d.): Richard Underwood
15 February 1572 – 1576 (d.): Thomas Roberts (bishop's grant)
bef. 1572 (disp.): John Rugge (ineffective bishop's grant)
1 August 1573 (disp.): George Gardiner (disputed queen's grant; Dean of Norwich from November 1573)
9 August 1581 – 4 September 1604 (d.): John Freake
12 September 1604–bef. 1618 (d.): Thomas Jegon
13 April 1618–bef. 1652 (d.): Andrew Bing
18 October 1660 – 31 March 1668 (d.): William Gery
20 April 1668–?: John Reynolds
8 June 1676 – 12 March 1694 (d.): John Conant
19 April 1694 – 1 April 1720 (d.): John Jeffery
5 May 1720–bef. 1722 (res.): William Trimnel (became Dean of Winchester)
22 February 1722 – 19 May 1742 (d.): Christopher Clarke
13 July 1742–bef. 1744 (res.): Matthew Postlethwayte
11 October 1744 – 13 June 1782 (d.): John Berney
15 June 1782–bef. 1814 (res.): William Yonge
22 November 1814 – 10 September 1844 (d.): Henry Bathurst
23 September 1844 – 29 March 1857 (d.): John Collyer
1 July 1857 – 27 March 1868 (d.): Robert Hankinson

Late modern

1868–7 January 1878 (d.): Augustus Hopper
1878–1910: Thomas Perowne (died 1913)
1910–24 February 1918 (d.): Frederick Westcott
1918–1920 (res.): Charles Lisle Carr (became Archdeacon of Sheffield)
1920–1938: George MacDermott
1937–1954: Thomas Perowne (died 1954) (son of the above)
1954–1961 (ret.): Robert Meiklejohn (afterwards archdeacon emeritus)
1961–1973 (res.): Aubrey Aitken (became Bishop–Archdeacon of Lynn)
1973–1981 (res.): Timothy Dudley-Smith (became Bishop of Thetford)
1981–1993 (res.): Michael Handley (became Archdeacon of Norfolk)
1994–2008 (ret.): Clifford Offer
2009–29 June 2016 (res.) Jan McFarlane (became Bishop of Repton)
13 November 20161 April 2022 (res.): Karen Hutchinson
1 October 2022present: Keith James

References

Sources

Lists of Anglicans
 
Lists of English people
Norfolk-related lists